Francisco Alberto García Gutiérrez (born December 31, c. 1981) is a Dominican former professional basketball player who played nine seasons in the NBA. The 6'7", 195-pound swingman played college basketball at the University of Louisville before being selected by the Sacramento Kings with the 23rd overall pick of the 2005 NBA draft, where he spent eight year of his NBA career. He also played three seasons for the Houston Rockets.

College career
He graduated from Cheshire Academy. As a college basketball player at Louisville under coach Rick Pitino, García enjoyed great success along with future NBA player Reece Gaines. He averaged 15.7 points per game as a junior and, along with teammate and best friend Taquan Dean, led his fourth-seeded team to the 2005 Final Four in Saint Louis, Missouri.

In April 2005, he declared for the NBA draft, foregoing his final year of college eligibility.

Professional career

Sacramento Kings (2005–2013)
García was selected with the 23rd overall pick by the Sacramento Kings in the 2005 NBA draft. In his rookie season for the Kings, García appeared in 67 games and averaged 5.6 points per game. In September 2008, he signed a five-year contract extension with the Kings.

Houston Rockets (2013–2014)
On February 20, 2013, García was traded to the Houston Rockets along with Thomas Robinson and Tyler Honeycutt in exchange for Patrick Patterson, Toney Douglas and Cole Aldrich.

On August 5, 2013, García re-signed with the Rockets.

On August 22, 2014, García again re-signed with the Rockets. On December 19, 2014, he was waived by the Rockets following the acquisition of Corey Brewer and Alexey Shved in a trade.

Vaqueros de Bayamón (2016)
On January 14, 2016, García signed with Vaqueros de Bayamón of the Puerto Rican League. On May 12, he was waived by Bayamón.

Indios de San Francisco (2017)
In 2017, García played for Indios de San Francisco of the Liga Nacional de Baloncesto.

NBA career statistics

Regular season

|-
| align="left" | 
| align="left" | Sacramento
| 67 || 11 || 19.4 || .400 || .285 || .772 || 2.8 || 1.4 || .6 || .7 || 5.6
|-
| align="left" | 
| align="left" | Sacramento
| 79 || 5 || 17.8 || .429 || .356 || .833 || 2.6 || 1.1 || .6 || .5 || 6.0
|-
| align="left" | 
| align="left" | Sacramento
| 79 || 20 || 26.5 || .463 || .391 || .779 || 3.3 || 1.6 || 1.2 || .6 || 12.3
|-
| align="left" | 
| align="left" | Sacramento
| 65 || 36 || 30.4 || .444 || .398 || .820 || 3.4 || 2.3 || 1.2 || 1.0 || 12.7
|-
| align="left" | 
| align="left" | Sacramento
| 25 || 4 || 23.0 || .466 || .390 || .882 || 2.6 || 1.8 || .4 || .8 || 8.1
|-
| align="left" | 
| align="left" | Sacramento
| 58 || 34 || 23.9 || .436 || .362 || .855 || 2.3 || 1.2 || .9 || .8 || 9.7
|-
| align="left" | 
| align="left" | Sacramento
| 49 || 3 || 16.3 || .376 || .290 || .800 || 2.0 || .6 || .7 || .8 || 4.8
|-
| align="left" | 
| align="left" | Sacramento
| 40 || 15 || 17.8 || .376 || .367 || .857 || 1.7 || 1.1 || .8 || .8 || 5.2
|-
| align="left" | 
| align="left" | Houston
| 18 || 5 || 17.7 || .432 || .386 || .857 || 1.3 || 1.1 || .8 || .4 || 6.4
|-
| align="left" | 
| align="left" | Houston
| 55 || 4 || 19.7 || .401 || .358 || .526 || 2.2 || 1.1 || .5 || .6 || 5.7
|-
| align="left" | 
| align="left" | Houston
| 14 || 0 || 14.3 || .270 || .222 || .250 || 1.2 || 1.1 || .6 || .4 || 3.2
|- class="sortbottom"
| style="text-align:center;" colspan="2"| Career
| 549 || 137 || 21.6 || .427 || .357 || .799 || 2.6 || 1.4 || .8 || .7 || 7.9

Playoffs

|-
| align="left" | 2006
| align="left" | Sacramento
| 6 || 0 || 6.8 || .455 || .250 || 1.000 || .3 || .2 || .3 || .3 || 2.2
|-
| align="left" | 2013
| align="left" | Houston
| 6 || 3 || 27.3 || .440 || .459 || .600 || 3.3 || 1.5 || .7 || .8 || 10.7
|-
| align="left" | 2014
| align="left" | Houston
| 2 || 0 || 11.0 || .333 || .000 || .705 || 1.0 || .0 || .0 || .0 || 3.5
|- class="sortbottom"
| style="text-align:center;" colspan="2"| Career
| 14 || 3 || 16.2 || .433 || .409 || .727 || 1.7 || .7 || .4 || .5 || 6.0

Notes

References

External links

1981 births
2014 FIBA Basketball World Cup players
Living people
All-American college men's basketball players
Basketball players at the 2003 Pan American Games
Cheshire Academy alumni
Houston Rockets players
Louisville Cardinals men's basketball players
Medalists at the 2003 Pan American Games
National Basketball Association players from the Dominican Republic
Pan American Games gold medalists for the Dominican Republic
Pan American Games medalists in basketball
Sacramento Kings draft picks
Sacramento Kings players
Shooting guards
Small forwards
Sportspeople from Santo Domingo
Dominican Republic people of Spanish descent
The Winchendon School alumni